Oxneria fallax, also known as the hooded sunburst lichen, is a small yellow-orange to red-orange foliose lichen that grows on bark or rarely on rock or bone. It is found all over the world except very dry areas, with 10 species common in North America. The nonfruiting body (thallus) grows in rosettes to 3 cm in diameter. The rosettes sometimes coalesce with each other. The lobes may appear divided at the tips. It is sometimes tightly appressed to the substrate (adnate), and sometimes not. The fruiting bodies (apothecia) are lecanorine, meaning that they are disc-like with a ring or rim of tissue around the disc that is made of tissue similar to the thallus. The tips of the lobes form hood shaped soralia that produce powdery greenish yellow soredia. It prefers growing on elm or oak bark, but can also be found on rocks, bone, or other wood types. Lichen spot tests on the surface are K+ purple, C−, KC−, and P−.

References

Teloschistales